Hubert Radke (born October 25, 1980 in Radziejów) is a Polish former professional basketball player who played at the center position. Radke represented the Poland national basketball team a total of 13 times between 2004 and 2005.

Achievements with club

Anwil Włocławek
 Polish Basketball League:
 Runner-up: 1999, 2005

References

1980 births
Living people
Centers (basketball)
Expatriate basketball people in Estonia
KK Włocławek players
Loyola Ramblers men's basketball players
People from Radziejów County
Polish expatriate basketball people in the United States
Polish men's basketball players
Polish people of German descent
Sportspeople from Kuyavian-Pomeranian Voivodeship
Turów Zgorzelec players